Taylor Darnell Brown (born August 4, 1989) is an American professional basketball player who plays as power forward.

Professional career
On February 25, 2017, Brown moved to Lietuvos rytas Vilnius by signing a 1+1 deal with Rytas paying buyout to the Polish team. On May 24, 2017, it was reported that Brown along with other American-born teammates Corey Fisher and Clevin Hannah were partying and consuming alcohol in Vilnius nightclubs right after losing the Game 3 of the LKL Playoffs on May 20. All of them were denying the fact but the incontestable pictures were published, which shattered all the doubts. The semi-final game was crucial as following it the series moved to Panevėžys, where Rytas lost the game and the series 1–3, resulting in second shocking fiasco during the same season for the club. On the same May 24, all three players were suspended from the team. On May 25, head coach Rimas Kurtinaitis said that it was not the first time when all three players were behaving unprofessionally and that they were ignoring previous warnings. Some witnesses noted that Taylor Brown previously was also consuming drugs. Not surprisingly, the team has shown no interest in keeping Brown for his second season and the contract was terminated by noting that character and devotion are essential properties for the players.

Brown joined Liga ACB side Real Betis Energía Plus on August 25, 2017. However, the deal was voided five days later after a failed physical.

Personal life
He is the son of a former EuroLeague champion and NBA player Rickey Brown.

References

External links
Bradley Braves bio

1989 births
Living people
American expatriate basketball people in Belgium
American expatriate basketball people in Lebanon
American expatriate basketball people in Lithuania
American expatriate basketball people in Mexico
American expatriate basketball people in Poland
American expatriate basketball people in Saudi Arabia
American expatriate basketball people in Sweden
American expatriate basketball people in Syria
American expatriate basketball people in Turkey
American men's basketball players
Basketball players from Atlanta
BC Rytas players
Bradley Braves men's basketball players
Brussels Basketball players
Darüşşafaka Basketbol players
Halcones de Ciudad Obregón players
Power forwards (basketball)